Lee Seok-hyun (born 16 March 1951) is a South Korean politician currently serving as the executive vice president of National Unification Advisory Council chaired by President Moon Jae-in from September 2021 previously served as Deputy Speaker of the National Assembly and its six-term parliamentarian.

Lee was first admitted to Seoul National University as its engineering student but quit to reapply to study law. During his studies, he actively participated in pro-democracy, student activism movement and produced and distributed its newspapers with Choi Gee-sung but was never imprisoned.  

After finishing his studies, he started working for insurance company not preparing for bar exam - a typical route for law graduates - to avoid taking governmental roles under totalitarian regime of Park Chung-hee. He then founded pro-democracy civil organisation with Moon Hee-sang funded by the eldest son of Kim Dae-jung in 1980. With the martial law issued following the Seoul Spring, he tried to run away but was later captured and tortured by Defense Security Command.

In 1985 upon return from the United States, Kim Dae-jung employed him as his personal secretary. In 1988 he ran as a candidate of Kim's party but lost. In 1997 Lee, then-two term parliamentarian from Anyang, became the centre of politics when his business card which had his name in 7 languages marked nationality of his, South Korean, in a way used by North Koreans in Mandarin. He subsequently resigned from his party and stayed in Mountain Gyeryongsan. He returned to the party long after his party's victory in the 1997 South Korean presidential election.

After losing the re-election in 2000 to Shim Jae-chul, he was appointed as CEO of Korea Environment Corporation run by Ministry of Environment under President Kim Dae-jung from 2000 to 2003. 

After returning to the National Assembly in 2004, Lee was elected as the chair of its Health and Welfare Committee. He also took chairmanship of its special committees on reforming the National Pension Service twice in 2005 and 2011, State-owned enterprise in 2008 and Low birth rate-Aging society in 2008. 

In 2014 he was elected as the Deputy Speaker of the Assembly. He is well known to the public for his chairing filibuster against controversial anti-terror bill at the plenary - most notably when Cho Won-jin tried to interrupt Lee's party parliamentarian's speech. In the 2020 election, he lost his primary and did not run for re-election. In 2021 he was appointed by then party leader Lee Nak-yon to lead party's campaign in two by-elections in two populous cities of the country, Seoul and Busan, as the head of its advisory board. 

In August 2021 President Moon Jae-in appointed him as his deputy at National Unification Advisory Council. 

Lee holds LLB from Seoul National University.

Electoral history

References 

Living people
1951 births
Members of the National Assembly (South Korea)
Minjoo Party of Korea politicians
Deputy Speakers of the National Assembly (South Korea)
Uri Party politicians
People from Iksan
Seoul National University alumni